The Asian Open Figure Skating Trophy (or Asian Trophy; previously known as the Asian Figure Skating Championships) is an annual figure skating competition sanctioned by the Asian Skating Union. Skaters compete in the disciplines of men's and ladies' singles across three levels: senior, junior, and novice.

Following an ASU meeting in Changchun, China during the 6th Asian Winter Games 2007, the ASU revised the name of the competition from the Asian Figure Skating Championships to the Asian Figure Skating Trophy, with the International Skating Union approving the change. Since 2013, the event has been titled the Asian Open Figure Skating Trophy and skaters from other continents have participated. In 2018 this event was part of the 2018–19 ISU Challenger Series. Part of the competition is also designated as a Challenger Series event in 2019 as well.

The 2011 competition at Dongguan, China was hosted by the Hong Kong Skating Union. The 2019 competition at the same city will be also hosted by the Hong Kong Skating Union.

Senior medalists
CS: ISU Challenger Series

Men

Women

Pairs

Ice dance

Junior medalists

Men

Ladies

Novice medalists

Men

Ladies

References

ISU Challenger Series
Figure skating competitions
Figure Skating
Recurring sporting events established in 2007